Riga Football Club, commonly referred to as Riga FC, is a Latvian football club, founded in 2014. The club is based at the Skonto Stadium in Riga. Since 2016 the club has been playing in the Virslīga.

History
The club was officially registered in April 2014. The team was established before the 2015 season after a merger of two Riga based teams – FC Caramba and Dinamo Rīga. In the 2015 season the team played in the Latvian First League under the name of FC Caramba/Dinamo, since Caramba had won promotion to the 1. līga after winning the Latvian Second League in 2014. After winning the First League and promotion to the Higher League, the club changed its name to Riga FC. In 2018 was appointed as coach the Ukrainian Viktor Skrypnyk, where he managed to lead to win two Latvian Higher Leagues in 2018, 2019 and the Latvian Football Cup in 2018.

Domestic

European

Notes
 1QR: First qualifying round
 2QR: Second qualifying round 
 3QR: Third qualifying round
 PO: Play-off round

Honours
Latvian Higher League
Champions: 2018, 2019, 2020
Runners-up: 2022

Latvian Cup
Winners: 2018
Runners-up: 2016–17, 2017

Latvian First League
Champions: 2015

Kits

Kit suppliers and shirt sponsors

Players

Current squad

Out on loan

Captains

Current staff
As of 10 January 2023

Current board
As of 13 March 2021

Notable players

Latvia
 Kristaps Blanks
 Boriss Bogdaškins
  Antonijs Černomordijs
  Vladislavs Fjodorovs
  Vladislavs Gabovs
  Kaspars Gorkšs
 Vadims Gospodars
  Vladimirs Kamešs
  Artūrs Karašausks
  Andrejs Kovaļovs
  Sergejs Kožans
  Antons Kurakins
  Oļegs Laizāns
  Ivans Lukjanovs
  Germans Māliņš
 Roberts Ozols
 Andrejs Perepļotkins
 Armands Pētersons
 Ēriks Punculs
 Deniss Rakels
 Deniss Romanovs
 Ritvars Rugins
 Roberts Savaļnieks
 Vitālijs Smirnovs
 Elvis Stuglis
 Valērijs Šabala
 Oļegs Timofejevs
 Daniils Turkovs
 Maksims Uvarenko
 Aleksejs Višņakovs
 Artūrs Zjuzins
Europe
  Herdi Prenga
 Edgar Babayan
  Adnan Šećerović
 Ivan Brkić
 Ivan Paurević
  Tomislav Šarić

  Jakub Hora
  Bogdan Vaštšuk
  Mikael Soisalo
  Davit Skhirtladze
  Giorgos Valerianos
  Thanos Petsos
  Kévin Bérigaud
  Joël Bopesu
  Jean-Baptiste Léo
 Axel Óskar Andrésson
 Stefan Ljubicic
 Besar Halimi
 Egzon Belica
 Stefan Milošević 
  Milan Vušurović
  Abdisalam Ibrahim
  Kamil Biliński
  Pedrinho
  Talocha
  Khyzyr Appayev
  Vitaliy Fedotov
  Vladislav Khatazhyonkov
  Denis Kniga
  Ivan Knyazev
 Stanislav Krapukhin
  Ivan Sergeyev
 Sergei Shumeyko
 Danila Yanov
  Ivan Yenin
  Dušan Brković
  Marko Đurišić
  Darko Lemajić
  Mario Maslać
  Stefan Panić
  Nedeljko Piščević
  Miloš Vranjanin
  Rene Mihelič
  Volodymyr Bayenko
  Roman Debelko
 
  Oleksandr Filippov
  Vladlen Yurchenko
  Valeriy Fedorchuk
  Bohdan Kovalenko
  Ihor Lytovka
  Myroslav Slavov
  Vyacheslav Sharpar
  Yuriy Vakulko
  Serhiy Zahynaylov
  Pavlo Fedosov
Africa
  Aristide Bancé
  Gaël Etock
  Kule Mbombo
 Ngonda Muzinga
 Jordan Nkololo
 David Addy
 Karim Loukili
 George Davies
 John Kamara
Asia
  Yōsuke Saitō
  Minori Sato
South America
 Federico Bravo
  Felipe Brisola
  Dário
  Stênio Júnior
 Wesley Natã
  Thiago Primão
 Gabriel Ramos
 Roger
 Lipe Veloso
  Brayan Angulo
 Juan Camilo Saiz

Former managers

Player records

Top goalscorers

Bold signifies a current Riga FC player

Most appearances

Bold signifies a current Riga FC player

References

Notes

External links

Latvian Higher League website 

 
Football clubs in Riga
2014 establishments in Latvia